Haslund may refer to:

 Charlotte Haslund-Christensen (born 1963), Danish lens-based visual artist
 Ebba Haslund (1917–2009), Norwegian novelist, writer, radio speaker and politician
 Henning Haslund-Christensen (1896–1948), Danish travel writer and anthropologist
 Margit Haslund (1885–1963), Norwegian women's advocate and local politician
 Nini Haslund Gleditsch (1908–1996), Norwegian political activist and advocate for peace
 Otto Haslund (1842–1917), Danish painter
 Veslemøy Haslund (1939–2005), Norwegian actress and stage producer

Danish-language surnames
Norwegian-language surnames